Trans-Sahara may refer to:

Trans-Saharan trade route
Trans-Sahara Highway, a transnational highway
Operation Enduring Freedom – Trans Sahara